James Albert Hamilton (January 24, 1876 New York City – May 7, 1950) was an American politician from New York.

Life
He was the son of John Coulter Hamilton, an Irish immigrant who came to New York in 1864, and Margaret Scott (Vance) Hamilton. He attended Public School No. 32 in Manhattan, and graduated from New York Evening High School in 1892, and B.A. from University of Rochester in 1898. He was a school teacher in New York City from 1898 to 1914. While teaching, he took graduation courses, and received the degrees of M.A. in 1903, LL.B. in 1904 and Ph.D in 1909. On October 11, 1904, he married Georgiana Elizabeth Montgomery, and they had six children.

He was a member of the New York State Senate (22nd D.) in 1915 and 1916. He was NYC Commissioner of Correction from 1918 to 1922. He was Secretary of State of New York from 1923 to 1924, elected at the New York state election, 1922 but defeated for re-election at the New York state election, 1924. He was an alternate delegate to the 1928 Democratic National Convention. He was New York State Industrial Commissioner from 1925 to 1929.

Sources
 The opening of free ice stations, in NYT on July 9, 1919
 His statement on the gas price, in NYT on November 1922
 NYC Correction History
Bio transcribed from The Bronx and Its People (1927)

Secretaries of State of New York (state)
1876 births
1950 deaths
Democratic Party New York (state) state senators
Politicians from New York City